Danai Udomchoke was the defending champion, but he chose not to compete this year.
Lim Yong-Kyu won in the final 6–1, 6–4 against Lu Yen-hsun.

Seeds

Draw

Finals

Top half

Bottom half

References
Main Draw
Qualifying Singles

Busan Open Challenger Tennis - Singles
2010 Singles